George Joseph Moriarty (July 7, 1884 – April 8, 1964) was an American third baseman, umpire and manager in Major League Baseball (MLB) from 1903 to 1940. He played for the Chicago Cubs, New York Highlanders, Detroit Tigers, and Chicago White Sox from 1903 to 1916.

Life
Moriarty was born in Chicago, where he grew up near the Union Stock Yards. He made his major league debut on September 7,  at the age of 19 with the Cubs. He was an average hitter but an outstanding baserunner, with 20 or more stolen bases in eight consecutive seasons and 248 career stolen bases, including eleven steals of home. He played his last major league game on May 4,  with the White Sox.

Afterward, he became an American League umpire from 1917 to 1940, interrupted only by a 2-year stint as manager of the Tigers in 1927–28. He was one of the AL's most highly regarded umpires in his era, working in the 1921, 1925, 1930, 1933 and 1935 World Series (as crew chief in 1930 and 1935), as well as the second All-Star Game in 1934.

On Memorial Day in 1932, Moriarty worked behind the plate for a Cleveland Indians home game against the White Sox. When several Chicago players took exception to his calls, he challenged them to settle the dispute under the stands of League Park after the game. Pitcher Milt Gaston took him on first but Moriarty knocked him flat, breaking his hand. Several White Sox, including manager Lew Fonseca and catcher and future AL umpire Charlie Berry, took him on in turn. The next day, AL president Will Harridge issued numerous fines and a 10-day suspension for Gaston.

It is reported that once while Moriarty was umpiring, none other than Babe Ruth stepped out of the batter's box and asked Moriarty to spell his last name. When he did so, Ruth reportedly replied, "Just as I thought; only one I." The baseball card shown to the left of this text, however, misspells Moriarty's name with two I's.

Moriarty also was noted for coming to the defense of Tiger slugger Hank Greenberg in the 1935 World Series (eventually won by Detroit), when he warned several Chicago Cubs to stop yelling antisemitic slurs at Greenberg. When they defied him and kept up the abuse, he took the unusual step of clearing the entire Chicago bench—a move that got him fined by longtime Commissioner/Judge Kenesaw Mountain Landis (known primarily to posterity for keeping blacks out of the major leagues throughout his quarter-century in office). Three years later, when Greenberg was pursuing Babe Ruth's single-season home run record, Moriarty kept the final game of the  season going until darkness made it impossible to continue, Greenberg finishing with 58 homers, two shy of Ruth's record.

In his biography, Greenberg recalled:

Despite his combative field persona Moriarty was quite congenial off the field, maintaining close friendships with Jesuit priests at the College of the Holy Cross in central Massachusetts. He also fancied himself a lyricist, supplying the words for  Richard A. Whiting's tune "Love Me Like the Ivy Loves the Old Oak Tree." and J. R. Shannon on "Maybe I'll Forget You Then" and "Ragtime 'Rastus Brown" in 1912.

On the other hand, during 1944 divorce proceedings his wife testified, "His attitude toward the next-door neighbors was of intense hatred for no reason whatever. One time he heard the neighbor's radio. He was so angry he carried our radio to the open window next to the neighbor and turned it on full blast for about three hours."

Moriarty joined the AL public relations staff after retiring from field work, and later became a scout for the Tigers, helping to discover such players as hard-hitting Harvey Kuenn and southpaw Billy Hoeft before retiring in December 1958.

He died in Miami at 79, and was buried at Saint Mary Catholic Cemetery in Evergreen Park, Illinois.

Family
Moriarty was the grandfather of actor and former Law & Order star Michael Moriarty, who also played pitcher Henry Wiggen in the 1973 baseball movie Bang the Drum Slowly.

See also

List of Major League Baseball career stolen bases leaders
List of Major League Baseball umpires
1909 Detroit Tigers season

References

External links

Retrosheet

1884 births
1964 deaths
Baseball players from Chicago
Chicago Cubs players
Chicago White Sox players
Davenport River Rats players
Detroit Tigers managers
Detroit Tigers players
Detroit Tigers scouts
Major League Baseball umpires
Major League Baseball third basemen
New York Highlanders players
Minor league baseball managers
Sportspeople from Chicago
Rock Island Islanders players